Pustula is a genus of plant-parasitic oomycetes segregated from Albugo. The name is derived from Latin's pustula meaning "blister".

References

Water mould genera
Albuginaceae

ru:Albuginaceae